Royal Global University (RGU) , officially established as The Assam Royal Global University, is the fifth private university of Assam. No:1 Private University of Assam. The Assam Royal Global University, under the Umbrella of Royal Group of Institutions has been established by The Assam Royal Global University Bill, passed by the Assam Legislative Assembly and the same has been assented by the Honorable Governor of Assam. The Assam Royal Global University Act, 2013 has been notified by the Government in the Assam Gazette. It is located in Betkuchi, opposite to Balaji Temple, Guwahati. Mr. A.K. Pansari is the chancellor of Royal Global University, Prof. (Dr.) S.P. Singh is the vice-chancellor and Mr. A.K. Modi is the pro chancellor.

Academics
Royal Global University (RGU) with 13 institutions under it. The Royal Group of Institutions was established in  2009, offering courses in Engineering, Management, Architecture and Commerce.
The schools under RGU are :
Royal School of Applied and Pure Sciences (RSAPS)
Royal School Of Architecture (RSA)
Royal School Of Design (RSD)
Royal School Of Behavioral & Allied Sciences (RSBAS)
Royal School of Engineering & Technology (RSET)
Royal School of Business (RSB)
Royal School of Commerce (RSC)
Royal School of Communication & Media (RSCOM)
Royal School of Fashion Designing & Technology (RSFT)
Royal School of Fine Arts (RSFA)
Royal School of Information Technology (RSIT)
Royal School of Language (RSL)
Royal School of Law and Administration (RSLA) 
Royal School of Performing Arts (RSPA)
Royal School of Humanities and Social Sciences (RSHSS)
Royal School of Pharmacy (RSP)

References

External links 
 Official Website
  Placement Website

Private universities in India
Universities in Assam
Universities and colleges in Guwahati
2013 establishments in Assam
Educational institutions established in 2013